Blyes is a commune in the Ain department in eastern France.

Geography
Blyes lies 8 km from Lagnieu, 5 km from the A42, 10 km from Meximieux, 4 km from Saint-Vulbas, and 6 km from Chazey-sur-Ain. It is located not far from the river Ain.

Population

See also
Communes of the Ain department

References

External links

Gazetteer Entry

Communes of Ain
Ain communes articles needing translation from French Wikipedia